In the mathematical theory of probability, the Wiener process, named after Norbert Wiener, is a stochastic process used in modeling various phenomena, including Brownian motion and fluctuations in financial markets. A formula for the conditional probability distribution of the extremum of the Wiener process and a sketch of its proof appears in work of H. J. Kusher (appendix 3, page 106) published in 1964. a detailed constructive proof appears in work of Dario Ballabio in 1978. This result was developed within a research project about Bayesian optimization algorithms.

In some global optimization problems the analytical definition of the objective function is unknown and it is only possible to get values at fixed points. There are objective functions in which the cost of an evaluation is very high, for example when the evaluation is the result of an experiment or a particularly onerous measurement. In these cases, the search of the global extremum (maximum or minimum) can be carried out using a methodology named "Bayesian optimization", which tend to obtain a priori the best possible result with a predetermined number of evaluations. In summary it is assumed that outside the points in which it has already been evaluated, the objective function has a pattern which can be represented by a stochastic process with appropriate characteristics. The stochastic process is taken as a model of the objective function, assuming that the probability distribution of its extrema gives the best indication about extrema of the objective function. In the simplest case of the one-dimensional optimization, given that the objective function has been evaluated in a number of points, there is the problem to choose in which of the intervals thus  identified is more appropriate to invest in  a further evaluation. If a Wiener stochastic process is chosen as a model for the objective function, it is possible to calculate the probability distribution of the model extreme points inside each interval, conditioned by the known values at the interval boundaries. The comparison of the obtained distributions provides a criterion for selecting the interval in which the process should be iterated. The probability value of having identified the interval in which falls the global extremum point of the objective function can be used as a stopping criterion. Bayesian optimization is not an efficient method for the accurate search of local extrema so, once the search range has been restricted, depending on the characteristics of the problem, a specific local optimization method can be used.

Proposition 
Let  be a Wiener stochastic process on an interval  with initial value 

By definition of Wiener process, increments have a normal distribution:
 

Let

 

be the cumulative probability distribution function of the minimum value of the  function on interval  conditioned by the value 

It is shown that:

Constructive proof 
Case  is an immediate consequence of the minimum definition, in the following it will always be assumed  and also corner case  will be excluded.

Let' s assume  defined in a finite number of points.

hence every neighbourhood of each point in  contains an element of one of the sets .

Let  be a real positive number such that 

Let the event  be defined as:     .

Having excluded corner case , it is surely .

Since  it is evidently . Now equation (2.1) will be proved.

(2.1)               

By the  events definition,, hence   . It will now be verified the relation  hence (2.1) will be proved.

hence  which implies (2.1).

(2.2) 

(2.2) is deducted from  (2.1), considering that  implies that the sequence of probabilities  is monotone non decreasing and hence it converges to its supremum. The definition of events  implies  and  (2.2)  implies .

In the following it will always be assumed , so  is well defined.

(2.3) 

(2.4) 

(2.5)

The above is explained by the fact that the random variable  has a symmetric probability density compared to its mean which is zero.

By applying in sequence relationships (2.3), (2.5) and (2.4) we get  (2.6) :

(2.6) 

With the same procedure used to obtain (2.3), (2.4) and (2.5)  taking advantage this time by the relationship  we get  (2.7):

(2.7) 

By applying in sequence (2.6) and (2.7) we get:

(2.8)      

which implies  .

(2.9) 

(2.10)

Applying the Bayes' theorem to the joint event  

(2.11)  

Let:  From the above definitions it follows:

(2.12)

Substituting (2.12) into (2.11), we get the equivalent:

(2.13)

Substituting (2.9) and (2.10) into (2.13):

(2.14)

It can be observed that in the second member of (2.14) appears the probability distribution of the random variable ,  normal  with mean  e variance .

(2.15) 

(2.16) 

Substituting (2.15) e (2.16) into (2.14) and taking the limit for   the thesis is proved:

Bibliography 
 A versatile stochastic model of a function of unknown and time varying form - Harold J Kushner - Journal of Mathematical Analysis and Applications Volume 5, Issue 1, August 1962, Pages 150-167.
 The Application of Bayesian Methods for Seeking the Extremum - J. Mockus, J. Tiesis, A. Zilinskas - IFIP Congress 1977, August 8–12 Toronto.

See also 
 Random variable
 Probability
 Event (probability theory)
 Conditional probability
 Regular conditional probability
 Stochastic process
 Wiener process

Notes

References 

Wiener process